The Congress of Leaders of World and Traditional Religions is held once every three years in Astana, Kazakhstan. The Congress was initiated by President Nursultan Nazarbaev of the Republic of Kazakhstan 19 years ago.

1st Congress of Leaders of World and Traditional Religions 
On September 23 and 24, 2003, Astana hosted the first Congress of Leaders of World and Traditional Religions. The congress was attended by 17 delegations from 23 countries. The forum focused mainly on countering terrorism and extremism issues.

2nd Congress of Leaders of World and Traditional Religions 
On September 12 and 13, 2006, Astana hosted the second Congress of Leaders of World and Traditional Religions, which was attended by delegations from 29 countries. The congress was held in a new building designed for the event, the Palace of Peace and Reconciliation. The central topic of discussion was “Religion, Society and International Security.” 

The congress was recognized in the Congressional Record by Congressman Ben Chandler of Kentucky who called Kazakhstan "a model of religious diversity."

As a result of the forum, a joint Declaration was adopted calling on representatives of all religions to resolve conflict situations through peaceful dialogue.

3rd Congress of Leaders of World and Traditional Religions 
On July 1–2, 2009, Astana hosted the third Congress of Leaders of World and Traditional Religions. About 400 delegates representing 77 delegations from 35 countries attended the event. A central theme of the congress was “The role of religious leaders in building a world based on tolerance, mutual respect and cooperation.”

4th Congress of Leaders of World and Traditional Religions 
The 4th Congress took place in Astana on May 30–31, 2012. 85 delegations from 40 countries attended the congress with the central theme being “Peace and Harmony as the Choice of Mankind.”

Within the framework of this forum, the first meeting of the Council of Religious Leaders was held, whose activities are aimed at determining the mechanisms of interaction with other foreign organizations in the cultural and economic spheres.

5th Congress of Leaders of World and Traditional Religions 
Astana hosted the 5th Congress on June 10–11, 2015. The theme of the event was "Dialogue of Religious Leaders and Politicians in the Name of Peace and Development". During the Congress, Kazakhstan President Nursultan Nazarbayev met with UN Secretary General Ban Ki-moon and Jordan's King Abdullah II. 80 delegations from 42 countries attended the event.

6th Congress of Leaders of World and Traditional Religions 
The 6th Congress of Leaders of World and Traditional Religions was held in Astana on October 10–11, 2018, and the theme was “Religious Leaders for a Safe World." 82 delegations from 46 countries participated in the sixth congress. Two plenary sessions and four breakout sessions were held at the forum. The themes of the sessions included: “Manifesto. The world in the 21st century as a Concept of Global Security”, “Religions in the Changing Geopolitics: New Opportunities for Mankind's Consolidation”, “Religion and Globalization: Challenges and Responses”, “Religious Leaders and Political Figures in Overcoming Extremism and Terrorism.”

Kazakhstan President Nazarbayev spoke at the 6th Congress on October 10. He outlined his vision for the role of technology in spreading the message of peace.

7th Congress of Leaders of World and Traditional Religions 

The 7th Congress of Leaders of World and Traditional Religions was held in Astana (then known as Nur-Sultan) on 14–15 September 2022. Pope Francis attended the 2022 event in person. According to Reuters, the Pope sought a meeting with Xi Jinping while both were in Kazakhstan but was declined.

See also
Parliament of the World's Religions

References

Kazakhstani religious leaders
Religious events